Raven was a rock band with blues and soul influences, formed in 1967 in Buffalo, New York, and active until 1970.

History
It was composed of Tony Galla (lead vocals), Jim Calire (piano/vocals), Gary Mallaber (drums), John Weitz (guitar), and Tom Calandra (bass guitar). Managed by Marty Angelo, the band played throughout the United States, appearing at such popular venues as the Electric Circus (nightclub), the Fillmore East, Steve Paul's Scene, Unganos in New York City, the Grande Ballroom in Detroit, Chicago's Kinetic Playground, and many others.

The group formed after Stan Szelest's group "Stan and the Ravens" broke up in 1967.  Two of its members, Calandra and Mallaber, joined Galla, Weitz, and Calire, in the group Tony Galla and the Rising Sons.  In 1968, they changed the name of their group to simply "Raven". Raven toured in England in 1969 and were offered a recording contract by George Harrison via Peter Asher with Apple Records. They turned it down to sign with Columbia Records instead. And although they played at the Woodstock Sound-Outs a year earlier, they declined invitations to appear at the Woodstock and Isle of Wight Festivals.

Discography

Singles
 Feelin' Good / Green Mountain Dream, Columbia/CBS, 1969
 Children At Our Feet / Here Come A Truck, Columbia/CBS, 1970

Albums
 Raven, Columbia/CBS, 1969
 Live at the Inferno, Discovery Records, 1969 (recorded 1967)

See also
 Famous people from Buffalo, New York

References 

 Richard DiLello, "The Longest Cocktail Party" - An Insider's Diary of the Beatles, Their Million Dollar 'Apple' Empire and Its Wild Rise and Fall. - pg. 119 - George Harrison instructs Peter Asher to "look up" the Raven (U.S. band) while in New York City.
 Patti Meyer Lee and Gary Lee, Don't Bother Knockin' -- This Town's A Rockin''' (Buffalo Sounds Press, October 20, 2000). .
 Marty Angelo, Once Life Matters: A New Beginning'' (Impact Publishers, 2005–2006), .

External links
 Tony Galla   
 Jimmy Calire   
 Gary Mallaber   
 [ Raven (American band) - Allmusic]

Rock music groups from New York (state)
Musical groups from Buffalo, New York
Musical groups established in 1967